Nicaragua Betrayed, published by Western Islands in 1980, is the memoir of former President of Nicaragua Anastasio Somoza Debayle (as told to Jack Cox), who had been toppled the previous year by the Sandinista insurgency. At the time of the book's publication, Somoza was living in Asunción, Paraguay, as a personal guest of President Alfredo Stroessner.

In the book Somoza gave his account of his administration, his downfall, and what he perceived to be the American betrayal of his country; he was particularly critical of the Carter Administration.

Shortly after the book's publication, Somoza and his chauffeur were assassinated in downtown Asunción by members of the Argentine People's Revolutionary Army. He is buried in Miami, Florida, at Woodlawn Park North Cemetery and Mausoleum.

A Spanish edition of the book, titled Nicaragua Traicionada, was also published.

See also 
Answer to History
John Birch Society
Western Goals Foundation

Notes

External links
Nicaragua Betrayed at Internet Archive
Nicaragua Betrayed at Google Books
Nicaragua Betrayed at OpenLibrary
Nicaragua Betrayed at WorldCat

History of Nicaragua
1980 non-fiction books
Political autobiographies
Somoza family